is the first album by the Japanese idol girl group SKE48. It was released in Japan on September 19, 2012 by Avex Group.

Album information 
'Kono Hi no Chime o Wasurenai' is the first original album released by SKE48. All of the 63 members of SKE48 had their own music video. This made the Album set a new Guinness World Record, for the most number of music videos on an album with 63 videos.

Reception 
The album debuted at number one on the Oricon daily chart, with first day sales of 51,875. It reached number two on Oricon's weekly chart, and stayed on the charts for 25 weeks.

Track listing 
The album contains eight of SKE48's previously released singles. Five original songs were written and performed respectively by: Team S, Team KII, Team E, Kenkyuusei, Selection 8, the last of which was a subunit of 8 SKE48 members. These songs were placed on each album version. The SKE48 teams then covered 3 AKB48 singles, "Beginner" by Team S, "Heavy Rotation" by Team KII, and "Ponytail to Shushu" by Team E.  The AKB48 cover songs were distributed across different album versions.

CD + DVD

CD Only

Oricon charts

Release history

References

External links 
 SKE48 Discography 
 HMV Online 

2012 debut albums
SKE48 albums
Avex Group albums